Rothia kristinae is a Gram positive bacterium. R. kristinae is a common human skin organism, but can cause opportunistic infections in humans.

Background

In 1974, a novel bacterium was isolated from the skin of a healthy adult woman. The novel species was originally named Micrococcus kristinae, and was named after the person from which it was first isolated (Kristin Holding). (Micrococcus lylae was also first isolated during the same study) In 1995, the species was reclassified into the genus Kocuria as Kocuria kristinae. In 2018, further studies reclassified the species into genus Rothia as Rothia kristinae.

R. kristinae is Gram-positive, and the cells are coccoid which tend to group together as tetrads. It is slightly facultatively anaerobic, and forms pale cream to pale orange colonies when grown on agar. The optimum growth range is 25–37 °C, and is resistant to lysozyme.

R. kristinae is a common skin and oral microorganism in humans. However, it can cause opportunistic infections for the immunocompromised.

References

External links
Vumicro entry
LPSN
Type strain of Kocuria kristinae at BacDive -  the Bacterial Diversity Metadatabase

Micrococcaceae
Bacteria described in 1974